The Frisch School, also known as Yeshivat Frisch , is a coeducational, Modern Orthodox, yeshiva high school located in Paramus, in Bergen County, in the U.S. state of New Jersey. It was founded in 1972 by Rabbi Menachem Meier and Alfred Frisch. The school primarily serves the Jewish communities of northern New Jersey, and New York. 

Frisch School is located at 120 West Century Road in Paramus. The campus has 41 classrooms, a learning center, six science laboratories, gymnasium,  library, music and art studios, a Beit Midrash, a makerspace (fab lab), and a publications room. Outdoors, the campus has a softball field, tennis courts, a basketball-hockey, and a soccer field encircled by a running track. The campus is named in honor of Henry Swieca, who donated the campus.

History  
Founded in 1972 by Rabbi Menachem Meier and Alfred Frisch, the school had been located at E. 243 Frisch Court in Paramus, on a  plot of land. 

For the 2007–08 school year, Frisch moved to 120 West Century Road in Paramus. Frisch purchased this site,  of land and an  office building, and renovated what had been an office building, constructing an  addition. The campus is named in honor of Henry Swieca, who donated the campus. The former Frisch building was sold in 2015 to the school Ben Porat Yosef.

Academics 
Frisch offers a dual curriculum of Judaic and secular studies. Incoming students choose between seven specialty tracks: Art, Beit Midrash, Engineering, Entrepreneurship, Music, Sports Management and Business Analysis, World Languages, and Writing. Each track provides specialized academic/vocational training.

Student population 
Most of the students are from the Jewish communities of Teaneck, Englewood, Fair Lawn, and Monsey, with some commuting from New York City and Central New Jersey.

As of the 2019–20 school year, the school had an enrollment of 860 students and 92.5 classroom teachers (on an FTE basis), for a student–teacher ratio of 9.3:1. The school's student body was 99.2% (853) White, 0.1% (1) Black and 0.7% (6) Asian.

Co-curricular programs and activities 

The school claims to have over 100 student clubs, in areas including the arts, languages, sciences, leadership and other interests.

Sports 
There are 25 athletic teams and seven athletic clubs in total. More than 70 percent of students participate on one or more of the sports teams and clubs. There are four basketball teams, one baseball team, two boys floor hockey teams, one girls floor hockey team, and one boys wrestling team, which consecutively won five Wittenberg wrestling titles. There are three volleyball teams – the girls volleyball teams have won the most championship games of any yeshiva volleyball team - three soccer teams, two swimming teams, three softball teams, one bowling team, and two track teams, among others. Frisch also has the first-ever yeshiva ice hockey team, which, in its first year of existence, qualified for the NJ state tournament. Frisch competes in ice hockey under the supervision of the New Jersey State Interscholastic Athletic Association. In 2016, half of Frisch's Yeshiva League sports teams qualified for the championships, and six teams won the championships.

The baseball team won three consecutive Metropolitan Yeshiva High School Athletic League titles (2014, 2015, 2016), and won the Columbus Baseball Invitational yeshiva high school tournament, dubbed the "Jewish World Series", in each of 2016 and 2017.

In 2015, Frisch won the Red Sarachek Tournament hosted by Yeshiva University for the first time. After losing in the championship game in 2013 and 2014, they defeated the Hebrew Academy of the Five Towns and Rockaway by a score of 75–73 in triple-overtime to claim the title. In 2017, Frisch came back and won the Sarachek Tournament, defeating the Shalhevet Firehawks (of Los Angeles) by a score of 49–47 in the tournament final.

In 2016, Frisch began hosting the Wittenberg Wrestling Tournament, after Yeshiva University announced that it would no longer host the annual event.

The ice hockey team won the McMullen Cup and Monsignor Kelly Cup in 2018. The team won the McMullen Cup in 2021 after defeating Scotch Plains-Fanwood High School by a score of 2-1 in the tournament final.

Chesed 
A Chesed Society coordinates community projects throughout the year. Frisch students run a winter camp for children with special needs who have off from public school during the winter break week.

Notable alumni 
 Eitan Bernath, class of 2020, social media personality, chef, and Principal Culinary Contributor on The Drew Barrymore Show
 Jeremy Dauber, class of 1990, Rhodes Scholar and Columbia University Professor of Yiddish Literature
Tali Farhadian, former federal prosecutor and current candidate for New York County District Attorney
 Alisa Flatow (1974–1995), victim of the Egged bus 36 bombing
 Rabbi Daniel Fridman, S'gan Rosh Yeshiva of Torah Academy of Bergen County and Rabbi of the Jewish Center of Teaneck
 Jeremy Frommer, financier and entrepreneur
 Ryan Karben (born 1974), former New York State Assemblyman
 Sharon Kleinbaum (born 1959), Senior Rabbi of New York City's Congregation Beit Simchat Torah
 Jared Kushner (born 1981), businessman, real estate investor and senior advisor to his father-in-law President Donald Trump
 Arthur Lenk (born 1964), Israeli Ambassador to Azerbaijan, 2005–2009 and South Africa, 2013–2017
 Daniel S. Nevins (born 1966), Dean of the Rabbinical School of the Jewish Theological Seminary of America
 Michael Salzhauer (born 1972), plastic surgeon and social media celebrity
 Rick Schwartz (born c. 1968), film producer
 Rena Sofer (born 1968), actress
 Regina Spektor (born 1980), singer and songwriter, attended the school for freshman and sophomore years
 Gil Student (born 1972), rabbi and publisher

Controversy 
In 2018, students were invited to participate in a voluntary letter writing campaign thanking President Trump if they "believe[d] that the president's decision was correct" regarding the relocation the U.S Embassy from Tel Aviv to Jerusalem. They were informed of the letter-writing campaign by the school's then-director of Israel education and faculty adviser of the school's Israel advocacy club, Rabbi David Sher. However, the letter-writing campaign itself was initiated by the Israel Advocacy organization NORPAC. Instructions for participating in the campaign included a reminder to "sign your name at the bottom," while NORPAC's boiler-plate letter praised the president's "courageous leadership" for the embassy decision. Sher's email stated twice that the campaign was voluntary.

The email was sent to students without prior parental consent, and some parents at the school lodged complaints in private forums, stating that the move was "sycophantic" and that the school should be "apolitical" and not attempt to "normalize Trump." Journalists at Ha'aretz and Newsweek got wind of this disapproval, and published articles misleadingly implying that the school forced or strongly urged all students to write letters praising Trump.

The school principal, Rabbi Eli Ciner, noted that these private conversations were leaked to the press also without parental consent. Ciner acknowledged that parents who did not agree with Trump complained, though stressed that the campaign was "completely voluntary" and that expression of different political opinions was an expression of democracy  In a statement to the Jewish Telegraphic Agency, Ciner stated, “As a religious Zionist school, we encourage our students as civic minded American citizens to write to the administration when they agree or disagree with the government’s policies regarding the State of Israel. In this particular case, many of our students strongly supported the president’s decision recognizing Jerusalem as Israel’s capital.” 

A columnist for Jewish Telegraphic Agency wrote regarding the letter writing campaign press coverage that "behaviors considered typical going back decades" were "distorted by their proximity to the 45th president" in this particular case, commenting that: Missing in much of the reporting was the fact that like much of the mainstream Jewish community, most Jewish schools see teaching about and advocating for Israel a central part of their mission and a key to instilling Jewish identity. If anything, Israel advocacy training has increased as Jewish organizations invest more resources in fighting the Boycott, Divestment and Sanctions movement aimed at Israel.

References

External links 
Frisch School Website
Data for Frisch Yeshiva High School, National Center for Education Statistics

1972 establishments in New Jersey
Educational institutions established in 1972
Jewish day schools in New Jersey
Middle States Commission on Secondary Schools
Modern Orthodox Jewish day schools in the United States
Modern Orthodox Judaism in New Jersey
Paramus, New Jersey
Private high schools in Bergen County, New Jersey
Orthodox yeshivas in New Jersey